Leistner is a German surname. Notable people with the surname include:

Achim Leistner, Australian master optician of the Avogadro project
Claudia Leistner (born 1965), German female figure skater
Hugo Leistner (1902–2002), American hurdler
Toni Leistner (born 1990), German footballer

German-language surnames